is an Echizen Railway Katsuyama Eiheiji Line train station located in the town of Eiheiji, Yoshida District, Fukui Prefecture, Japan.

Lines

Station layout
The station consists of one side platform serving a single bi-directional track. The station is unattended.

Adjacent stations

History
Kobunato Station was opened on March 11, 1914. Operations were halted from June 25, 2001. The station reopened on July 20, 2003 as an Echizen Railway station.

Passenger statistics
In fiscal 2016, the station was used by an average of 8 passengers daily (boarding passengers only).

Surrounding area
Since the station is nestled between hills to the south and the Kuzuryū River to the north, there are few structures of note. A bridge to the other side of the river is just west of the station.
Fukui Prefectural Route 168 passes to the south.

See also
 List of railway stations in Japan

References

External links

  

Railway stations in Fukui Prefecture
Railway stations in Japan opened in 1914
Katsuyama Eiheiji Line
Eiheiji, Fukui